The French ironclad Revanche was one of 10  armored frigates built for the French Navy during the 1860s. Commissioned in 1867, she was initially assigned to the Northern Squadron. The ironclad played a minor role in the Franco-Prussian War of 1870–1871, blockading the North Sea coast of Prussia. Revanche was placed in reserve after the war, but was reactivated in 1875, sometimes serving as a flagship. Assigned to the Mediterranean Squadron, she suffered a boiler explosion in 1877 that required extensive repairs and did not return to service until late 1878. The ship was decommissioned in 1883 and served in second-line duties, including service as a guard ship in 1892–1893, until she was stricken in early 1893 and subsequently scrapped.

Design and description

The Provence class was designed as an enlarged version of the s with thicker armor, more powerful guns, and better seakeeping qualities. They displaced . Their crew numbered 579–594 officers and enlisted men.

When the French discovered that the British ironclad  had reached  during her sea trials, they decided to add an extra cylinder to the engine of the five ships still under construction, including Revanche, in an attempt to achieve . She had a single three-cylinder horizontal-return connecting-rod steam engine that drove the propeller shaft, using steam provided by eight boilers.

Armament and protection
The main battery of the Provence-class ships was intended to be thirty  Modèle 1858–60 rifled muzzle-loading (RML) guns, but this was changed to a mixed armament of four  Modèle 1864 RMLs and six  Modèle 1864 smoothbore muzzle-loading guns on the gundeck. Positioned on the quarterdeck and the forecastle were another 194 mm smoothbore and six 164.7 mm Modèle 1858 RMLs, at least some of which served as chase guns. Shortly after commissioning, Revanches gundeck armament was probably changed to eight 240 mm Modèle 1864 RMLs.

The conning tower's sides consisted of  armor plates.

Construction and service
Revanche (Revenge) was ordered on 16 November 1860 from the Arsenal de Toulon, laid down in March 1861 and launched on 28 December 1865. She was commissioned for trials on 16 April 1867, and was definitively commissioned on 1 May under the command of Captain Bernard Jauréguiberry. By 1870 the ship was assigned to the Northern Squadron and Captain Laurent Lejeune was in command.

When the Franco-Prussian War began on 19 July 1870, the French had lost track of a squadron of four Prussian ironclads so the Mediterranean Squadron, including Revanche, was deployed to Oran, French Algeria, to intercept them in case they attempted to interdict the troop convoys between French North Africa and Metropolitan France. When they received word that the Prussian ships had returned to Germany, the squadron sailed to Brest to prepare to blockade the coast of Prussia. Revanche was assigned to Vice Admiral Léon Martin Fourichon's squadron that was tasked to blockade German ports in the Heligoland Bight. It departed Brest on 8 August and arrived off the British-owned island of Heligoland three days later. The neutral British denied the French permission to re-coal there and the ships were forced to perform it at sea under dangerous conditions. Bad weather and a series of storms beginning in late August prevented the squadron from coaling and the ships were forced to return to France in early September. By then the Prussians were besieging Paris and many of the trained gunners aboard the squadron's ships were transferred to defend the city. The squadron resumed the blockade with reduced crews until December when smaller ships took it over.

Revanche was reduced to reserve in Toulon on 20 March 1871 and was reactivated for service with the Mediterranean Squadron on 12 November 1875 where she became the flagship of Vice Admiral Pierre-Gustave Roze. On 20 March 1877 at Villefranche-sur-Mer there was a boiler explosion aboard the ship that killed 26 men and wounded 60 crewmen. Revanche returned to Toulon for repairs and was placed in reserve on 16 May. The ship conducted sea trials on 5 February 1878 and returned to active service on 20 October. Revanche then became the guard ship of the mobile defenses of Algiers, French Algeria, until she was stricken from the navy list on 10 January 1893 and subsequently scrapped.

Citations

Bibliography

Further reading

1863 ships
Provence-class ironclads
Ships built in France